The 2021 NCAA Division I Men's Lacrosse Championship was the 50th annual single-elimination tournament to determine the national championship for National Collegiate Athletic Association (NCAA) Division I men's college lacrosse. Because the Ivy League did not participate in lacrosse this season, no play-in game was required.

Sixteen teams competed in the tournament based upon their performance during the regular season. For eight teams, entry into the tournament was by means of a conference tournament automatic qualifier and/or play in, while for the remaining eight teams at-large selection was determined by the NCAA selection committee.

Tournament overview
Virginia took control over a 15 and 0 Maryland team in the Championship Game, and at one point led 16–11. But Maryland quickly closed that gap in the fourth quarter, scoring a goal with 10.8 seconds left to cut Virginia's lead to 17-16. Maryland had an open shot on goal to tie the game with two seconds left off a face off win, but a great save by Alex Rode won the title for UVA. This was Virginia's seventh NCAA lacrosse title.

Teams

Bracket

 * Overtime

Tournament boxscores

Tournament Finals

Tournament Semi-Finals

Tournament Quarterfinals

Tournament First Round

All-Tournament Team
Connor Shellenberger, Virginia (Most Outstanding Player)

Cade Saustad, Virginia

Alex Rode, Virginia

Petey LaSalla, Virginia

Jared Connors, Virginia

Matt Moore, Virginia

Nick Grill, Maryland

Logan Wisnauskas, Maryland

Jared Bernhardt, Maryland

William Perry, North Carolina

References

NCAA Division I Men's Lacrosse Championship
Lacrosse
 
NCAA Division I Men's Lacrosse
Lacrosse in Pennsylvania
Sports in Philadelphia
NCAA Division I Men's Lacrosse Championship